German submarine U-227 was a Type VIIC U-boat of Nazi Germany's Kriegsmarine built for service in the Battle of the Atlantic. She was cursed with repeated bad luck during her brief service life. Her commander was Kapitänleutnant Jürgen Kuntze, an officer with just five months U-boat experience at the time of his promotion.

Design
German Type VIIC submarines were preceded by the shorter Type VIIB submarines. U-227 had a displacement of  when at the surface and  while submerged. She had two shafts and two  propellers.

U-227 was fitted with five  torpedo tubes (four fitted at the bow and one at the stern), fourteen torpedoes, one  SK C/35 naval gun, 220 rounds, and an anti-aircraft gun. The boat had a complement of between forty-four and sixty.

Construction
U-227 was built during 1941 and 1942 by the Germaniawerft shipyard in the fleet base at Kiel as yard number 657, and was completed in August 1942, in preparation for operations over the coming winter. During the initial working-up period, disaster struck one month into the program, when U-227 ran onto a Royal Air Force mine dropped by an aircraft in Danzig Bay. The crippled boat survived without any serious injuries, but only just managed to limp into port. The mining of coastal waters was a new tactic for the RAF, but one which would reap dividends amongst the port-based German navy. The repairs to the boat following this misfortune meant that she was not ready for operations until the following April, when Kuntze, having worked his crew hard, embarked on his only war patrol.

Operational patrol
U-227 lasted a mere six days on her first operational patrol, when she was ordered to proceed with all haste to the North Atlantic Ocean to interdict Canadian convoys. Passing through the gap between the Faroe Islands and Iceland, she was spotted, despite bad weather, by a Hampden bomber of No. 455 Squadron, Royal Australian Air Force, which swooped onto the submarine and dropped a bomb on her. U-227 dived under the ocean following the attack and never resurfaced, presumably hitting the sea floor hundreds of feet below, where she still lies with all 49 of her crew.

References

Bibliography

External links

German Type VIIC submarines
World War II submarines of Germany
U-boats sunk by Australian aircraft
U-boats commissioned in 1942
U-boats sunk in 1943
1942 ships
World War II shipwrecks in the Norwegian Sea
Ships built in Kiel
Ships lost with all hands
Maritime incidents in April 1943